Elections to Armagh City, Banbridge and Craigavon Borough Council, part of the Northern Ireland local elections on 2 May 2019, returned 41 members to the council using Single Transferable Vote. The Democratic Unionist Party were the largest party in both first-preference votes and seats.

Election results

Note: "Votes" are the first preference votes.

The overall turnout was 52.81% with a total of 78,144 valid votes cast. A total of 1,165 ballots were rejected.

Districts summary

|- class="unsortable" align="centre"
!rowspan=2 align="left"|Ward
! % 
!Cllrs
! %
!Cllrs
! %
!Cllrs
! %
!Cllrs
! %
!Cllrs
! % 
!Cllrs
!rowspan=2|TotalCllrs
|- class="unsortable" align="center"
!colspan=2 bgcolor="" | DUP
!colspan=2 bgcolor="" | Sinn Féin
!colspan=2 bgcolor="" | UUP
!colspan=2 bgcolor=""| SDLP
!colspan=2 bgcolor="" | Alliance
!colspan=2 bgcolor="white"| Others
|-
|align="left"|Armagh
|12.9
|0
|bgcolor="#008800"|40.3
|bgcolor="#008800"|3
|13.3
|1
|21.5
|2
|5.3
|0
|6.7
|0
|6
|-
|align="left"|Banbridge
|23.0
|2
|14.1
|1
|bgcolor="40BFF5"|36.1
|bgcolor="40BFF5"|3
|10.8
|0
|11.7
|1
|4.2
|0
|7
|-
|align="left"|Craigavon
|bgcolor="#D46A4C"|26.1
|bgcolor="#D46A4C"|1
|21.3
|1
|19.7
|1
|23.3
|2
|7.2
|0
|2.4
|0
|5
|-
|align="left"|Cusher
|bgcolor="#D46A4C"|30.2
|bgcolor="#D46A4C"|1
|13.3
|1
|25.0
|2
|7.9
|0
|4.0
|0
|19.6
|1
|5
|-
|align="left"|Lagan River
|bgcolor="#D46A4C"|45.0
|bgcolor="#D46A4C"|3
|2.6
|0
|28.0
|1
|4.2
|0
|10.8
|1
|9.5
|0
|5
|-
|align="left"|Lurgan
|23.1
|1
|bgcolor="#008800"|36.9
|bgcolor="#008800"|3
|12.7
|1
|16.4
|1
|11.0
|1
|0.0
|0
|7
|-
|align="left"|Portadown
|bgcolor="#D46A4C"|41.3
|bgcolor="#D46A4C"|3
|18.4
|1
|18.0
|1
|8.6
|1
|5.1
|0
|8.6
|0
|6
|-
|- class="unsortable" class="sortbottom" style="background:#C9C9C9"
|align="left"| Total
|27.9
|11
|22.0
|10
|21.6
|10
|13.5
|6
|7.8
|3
|7.2
|1
|41
|-
|}

District results

Armagh

2014: 2 x Sinn Féin, 2 x SDLP, 1 x UUP, 1 x DUP
2019: 3 x Sinn Féin, 2 x SDLP, 1 x UUP
2014-2019 Change: Sinn Féin gain from DUP

Banbridge

2014: 3 x UUP, 2 x DUP, 1 x Sinn Féin, 1 x SDLP
2019: 3 x UUP, 2 x DUP, 1 x Sinn Féin, 1 x Alliance
2014-2019 Change: Alliance gain from SDLP

Craigavon

2014: 2 x DUP, 1 x SDLP, 1 x Sinn Féin, 1 x UUP
2019: 2 x SDLP, 1 x DUP, 1 x Sinn Féin, 1 x UUP
2014-2019 Change: SDLP gain from DUP

Cusher
2014: 2 x UUP, 1 x DUP, 1 x SDLP, 1 x Independent
2019: 2 x UUP, 1 x DUP, 1 x Sinn Féin, 1 x Independent
2014-2019 Change: Sinn Féin gain from SDLP

Lagan River

2014: 3 x DUP, 2 x UUP
2019: 3 x DUP, 1 x UUP, 1 x Alliance
2014-2019 Change: Alliance gain from UUP

Lurgan

2014: 3 x Sinn Féin, 2 x DUP, 1 x UUP, 1 x SDLP
2019: 3 x Sinn Féin, 1 x DUP, 1 x UUP, 1 x SDLP, 1 x Alliance
2014-2019 Change: Alliance gain from DUP

Portadown

2014: 2 x DUP, 2 x UUP, 1 x Sinn Féin, 1 x UKIP
2019: 3 x DUP, 1 x UUP, 1 x Sinn Féin, 1 x SDLP
2014-2019 Change: DUP and SDLP gain from UUP and UKIP

Changes during the term

† Co-options

‡ Changes in affiliation

– Suspensions
None

Last updated 7 November 2022.

Current composition: see Armagh City, Banbridge and Craigavon Borough Council

References

Elections in County Antrim
Elections in County Down
Elections in County Armagh
Armagh